Martina Feusi (born 17 June 1974) is a Swiss bobsledder. She competed in the two woman event at the 2006 Winter Olympics.

References

1974 births
Living people
Swiss female bobsledders
Olympic bobsledders of Switzerland
Bobsledders at the 2006 Winter Olympics
Sportspeople from Zürich